Sir Robert Davers, 2nd Baronet (c. 1653–1722) of Rougham and Rushbrooke Hall was an English politician and landowner.

Davers was the son of Sir Robert Davers, 1st Baronet, a Royalist who had made his fortune exploiting enslaved Africans on his plantation in Barbados. He owned 300 acres worked by 200 "negroes".  Davers was born in Barbados before coming to England between 1680 and 1682. He then returned to Barbados and took his seat in the Council there on 13 June 1682. On 30 November 1683 he was one of the Barons of the Court of Exchequer and of Pleas of Barbados. He inherited his father's baronetcy in 1684 and was picked to serve as High Sheriff of Suffolk for 1685, but did not take up the role.

He moved back permanently to England in 1687 and became the Member of Parliament for Bury St Edmunds in 1689. He sat in the Commons for the seat for a second term from 1703 to 1705, after which he was elected MP for Suffolk, holding that seat until his death in 1722.

Personal life
He married Hon. Mary Jermyn, daughter and co-heiress of Thomas Jermyn, 2nd Baron Jermyn. They had five sons and five daughters. By this marriage he acquired in 1703 one-fifth of the Rushbrooke Hall estate, of which he purchased the other parts from his sister-in-law, the wife of Sir Thomas Spring, 3rd Baronet. He sold the estate of Rougham between 1705 and 1710 to his son in law, Clement Corrance and made Rushbrooke the family's principle seat. Davers was succeeded by his son, Robert.

References

1653 births
1722 deaths
Baronets in the Baronetage of England
English MPs 1689–1690
English MPs 1690–1695
English MPs 1695–1698
English MPs 1698–1700
English MPs 1702–1705
English MPs 1705–1707
Members of the Parliament of Great Britain for English constituencies
British MPs 1707–1708
British MPs 1708–1710
British MPs 1710–1713
British MPs 1713–1715
British MPs 1715–1722
Politicians from Bury St Edmunds
Barbados planters